The Cornell Big Red Marching Band is the only corps style marching band (as opposed to a scatter band) in the Ivy League. It performs at all home, and most away, Cornell Big Red football games. In addition, the band has performed at halftime for numerous National Football League and Canadian Football League games, and began a tradition of an annual Spring Concert in 2006.

History

The band was first formed in the 1890s as a part of the Reserve Officers' Training Corps program. It remained under ROTC jurisdiction until 1948, at which time the band became affiliated with the Cornell Concert Band and the Cornell Repertory Band under the name Cornell Bands. After the BRMB left its military roots, it continued to evolve. Instrumental figures in overseeing these changes included William Campbell, the Director of Bands from 1947 to 1965, and Henry Romersa, Assistant Director and Drillmaster. Also crucial in these "silver age" bands was Nick Krukovsky '65, who for many years was the band's official cameraman/movie editor.

These changes would significantly alter the face of the band almost as much as its split from ROTC. With the admittance of women beginning in 1970, the BRMB became an increasingly social organization.

In previous years, the band aspired to be a Big Ten type marching band. However, during the early 1970s the band revolted against the strict disciplinary style of conventional marching bands and almost succumbed to campus pressure to become a scatter band like the other Ivy League bands. In 1971, the marching band became quite similar to the scatter bands in appearance, with the drum major wearing either a blazer or a dinner jacket. However, the band eventually returned to its traditional roots, and in 1973, the traditional drum major uniform returned for good.  Rather than the high-stepping Big Ten style of marching, the band now uses a modern "corps-style" marching technique (similar to Southeastern Conference marching bands) during performances.

The Band continued its tradition of entertaining shows and musical excellence. In 1971, the Band welcomed the talents of new Assistant Director Greg Pearson. He had a definite vision for the band's musicality, from his arrangement of pre-game and halftime shows, to his decision to switch the band to the crescent (home team) side of Schoellkopf Field.  While this moved the band away from the student section, it allowed the band to sound better with the concrete background and height offered by the crescent.

Alumni Association founded
The most significant addition to the band in the last 30 years has been the Big Red Bands Alumni Association in 1982. The BRBAA was founded as a way to maintain the financial and long-term security of the Band. Since then, the BRBAA has become one of the most active alumni groups at Cornell. During this time, band advisor Georgian Leonard spearheaded the first annual phonathon.

With the retirement of Professor Stith, Scott Jeneary came aboard as Big Red Band Music Director in 1989, and the position was later restructured and renamed Music Advisor. Matt Marsit served as music advisor from 2006 to 2009. The position of music advisor is now typically occupied by a graduate student from Ithaca College. Over the last twenty years, the band has become almost entirely student-run, and claims to be the largest student-run group in the Ivy League.  Students handle nearly all responsibilities handled by directors with other marching bands, including handling budgets and charting drills.

Fischell Band Center

For over a century, the Big Red Band was housed in a cramped room in Barton Hall. In 2013 the Fischell Band Center, a purpose-built home for the band, was completed adjacent to Schoellkopf Crescent on Kite Hill. The building is a three-story glass structure with slanted walls and ceilings for superior acoustics. It also includes display cases for memorabilia, photos, and uniforms.

Uniform

Prior to 2021, the uniform consisted of black pants with red vertical stripe, red coat with "Cornell" emblazoned on the front, black shoes, black gloves, white combination cap with a red "C".

The band debuted an all-new uniform design in September 2021 at the Homecoming game against VMI. The uniform keeps the black pants and red coat, and incorporates a black-and-white left sleeve with the word CORNELL in red. The new uniform also features the university seal on the upper right chest area.

Traditions

Aardvark
As originally performed, the aardvark was executed upright with the hands wiggling next to the ears. It has since evolved into a display during which the aardvarker, suspended from a railing, ladder, or other fixed object, warbles a series of shrill, upper register pitches as he bends his spine backward and shakes his arms wildly. No one is certain why this traditional exhibition was named after the burrowing, insectivorous mammal native to South Africa.

Post Game Concert
In 1947, as a result of an unfortunate incident which occurred during a gridiron encounter, the marching band started the tradition of a post game concert. In this particular game, a top-notch sophomore quarterback named Pete Dorset completed an amazing ten out of ten passes to lead Cornell to an upset 28-21 victory over Princeton at Palmer Stadium.

After the game, the jubilant members of the Big Red Band commenced to file out with the crowd as usual, but were beset by hecklers. Soon the band found itself involved in a small-scale riot. One Tigertown student snatched a trumpet; another attempted to wrest a tuba from its owner. Things quieted down quickly and the incident was soon forgotten. The next time the Big Red Band appeared at Princeton, it remained for an impromptu concert until the main body of spectators had filed out. The concert proved such a success that it was made a regular part of the band's schedule.

Victory Hats
At the end of each winning football game, band members turn each other's hats around 180 degrees. They remain backwards until removed at the end of the performing day.

Alumni Band
Each Homecoming weekend, Big Red Band alumni return to Ithaca, brush the cobwebs from their instruments, and join the Big Red Alumni Band. The first Alumni Band in 1982 was the brainchild of Drum Major Dwight Vicks III and Head Manager Bob Geise. The band grows in size each year as bandsmen from seven decades renew old friendships and find common bonds with fellow bandies from other eras.

Trumpet Push-ups, Flute-ups, and Sax-ups
After the Cornell Big Red scores in football, the trumpet section demonstrates their appreciation by doing pushups for each point scored by the team. In addition, the flute section also joins in with a series of "flute ups"; the section tosses a member of their section into the air for each point scored. Recently, the saxophone section has begun a similar tradition by lifting their saxes in the air while counting the points scored.

Sy Katz Parade

The Sy Katz '31 Parade is a biennial march in New York City which takes place on dates when the Cornell football team travels to Columbia. After the game, the Marching Band leads Cornell alumni, family, and friends down a short stretch of Fifth Avenue, ending with a concert in front of the Cornell Club of New York at 6 East 44th Street. The tradition was started in 1972 by Seymour "Sy" Katz '31 and was the length of one city block. The 2016 parade was headed by Provost Michael Kotlikoff as grand marshal. The 2018 parade, led by Cornell president Martha E. Pollack, marched from Rockefeller Center to the Cornell Club, attended by some 1,000 Cornell alumni, family members and friends.

Related links
 Cornell Big Red Pep Band
 Marching band

References

External links
 Cornell University Big Red Marching Band
 Big Red Marching Band Historian YouTube Channel

Sections
 Big Red Color Guard
 Big Red Saxes
 Big Red Clarinets
 Big Red Trumpets
 Big Red Flutes
 Big Red Tubas
 Big Red Horns
 Big Red Percussion

Cornell Big Red
College marching bands in the United States
Musical groups established in the 1890s
1890s establishments in New York (state)